Parathylia diversicornis is a species of beetle in the family Cerambycidae, and the only species in the genus Parathylia. It was described by Breuning in 1958.

References

Apomecynini
Beetles described in 1958
Monotypic beetle genera